Pravec could mean:
 Petr Pravec, a Czech astronomer
 Pravec, Bulgarian computers produced from 1979 until the early 1990s
 Pravec, a town in central-western Bulgaria